Club Deportivo Tapatío is the official reserve team of C.D. Guadalajara. It was dissolved in 2009 and has been replaced by Chivas Rayadas de Guadalajara before its own dissolution in 2019. In 2020 the team was reactivated for its participation in the Liga de Expansión MX.

History 
It was founded as Club Deportivo Tapatío in 1973 when CD Guadalajara purchased a license for the Tercera División. In two seasons Tapatío promoted to the Segunda División. The club mostly competed at the second level. After a relegation Tapatío bought the second level license from Gallos de Aguascalientes in 2001. In 2004 the team moved to La Piedad and competed as Chivas La Piedad. In the 2005/06 season the team was moved to Tepic and competed as Chivas Coras. The team returned to Guadalajara in 2006 and the Tapatío name was restored.

Before the Apertura 2009 tournament Tapatío ceased to exist. The league system was restructured and following new rules of the Mexican Federation of Association Football that teams in the Primera División will not be able to have a filial team in the Ascenso MX, the franchise was sold to Club Universidad de Guadalajara. Chivas Rayadas was then created and it serves as the new reserve team for Club Deportivo Guadalajara.

In 2020 the team was revived due to the creation of the Liga de Expansión MX, a league that replaced Ascenso MX with the aim of functioning as a development for football players.

Honours

Primera "A" 
 Runner up Primera división 'A' mexicana  Verano 2003.

Second Division 
  Segunda división mexicana Promotion: 1975
  Segunda división mexicana Runner Up: 1980-1981.

Second Division "B" 
 Second Division "B" (2): 1985-1986, 1993-1994.

Third Division 
Tercera División de México runner up:1973-1974, 1974–1975
  Copa México (1): 1972-1973
 Campeón de Campeones : 1993-1994 won 2-1 over Tigres UANL 
Runner Up 1973 He lost 1-0 to the UAG

Friendly tournaments 
 IV Copa Alianza: 2007
Verizon Wireless Copa Alianza, Winning 6-0 over Atlético Altamirano of Houston

Personnel

Management

Coaching staff

Players

Team squad

References 

C.D. Guadalajara
Association football clubs established in 1973
Association football clubs disestablished in 2009
Football clubs in Guadalajara, Jalisco
1973 establishments in Mexico
2009 disestablishments in Mexico